Cleveland Crossroads, also known as Elias, is an unincorporated community in Clay County, Alabama, United States.

History
Cleveland Crossroads was originally named Elias in honor of Elias B. Cleveland, the first postmaster. After the post office was discontinued, the name was changed to Cleveland Crossroads, also in honor of Elias Cleveland. At one point, Cleveland Crossroads was home to a church, school, mechanic shop, two general stores, and a grist mill. A post office operated under the name Elias from 1886 to 1905.

References

Unincorporated communities in Clay County, Alabama
Unincorporated communities in Alabama